Graham Scott may refer to:
 Graham Scott (public servant) (born 1942), former official of the New Zealand government and political candidate
Graham W. S. Scott (public servant) (born 1942), Canadian lawyer and public servant
 Graham Scott (footballer) (born 1946), former Australian rules footballer
 Graham Scott (referee) (born 1968), English football referee

See also